The Georgian Wikipedia is a Georgian language edition of free online encyclopedia Wikipedia.

Statistics

Currently it has 3 administrators and more than 73,000 registered users.

In 2019 the Georgian Wikipedia has 65,000 unique categories and 23.55% of them do not have an appropriate page in the category namespace. The average article in this language version has 3 categories, while number of unique categories per articles ratio is 0.509. The largest number of articles are in the Geography (24%) and History (14%) category. In the Georgian Wikipedia, articles relating to Music and Organizations have the highest average quality. Content about crime is read more often, and government-related articles have the highest authors' interest on average.

History

In early 2022, the Georgian Wikipedia changed its logo to reflect the blue and gold coloring of Ukraine's flag in response to the 2022 Russian invasion of Ukraine.

See also
Georgian language
List of Wikipedias

References

External  links

 Georgian Language Wikipedia
 Georgian Wikipedia mobile version
The embassy of the Georgian-language Wikipedia

Wikipedias by language
Internet properties established in 2003
Georgian-language encyclopedias
Georgian-language websites